VSD may refer to:

 .vsd, a file extension for Microsoft Visio diagrams
 VSD (French magazine) (Vendredi Samedi Dimanche; i.e. "Friday Saturday Sunday"), a French weekly news magazine
 Vaccine Safety Datalink, a Centers for Disease Control database containing vaccination and health records of over 7 million Americans
 Variable speed drive, or adjustable-speed drive, is a specific type of a variable-frequency drive
 Visible surface determination, also known as hidden surface determination
 Video Single Disc, a video disc format based on laserdisc that only was popular in Japan and the rest of Asia
 Voluntary Service Detachment, an Australian civil organization during World War II
 State Security Department of Lithuania, a Lithuanian intelligence agency
 Victory Star Destroyer, a fictional class of ship in the Star Wars universe
 Ventilation shutdown, a means of killing livestock

Medicine 
 Ventricular septal defect, a defect in the ventricular septum of the heart
 Virtually safe dose, a concept in regulatory toxicology, applied to carcinogens with no threshold of effects

Places 
 Vallivue School District, a school district in Idaho, United States
 Vancouver Public Schools, a school district in Vancouver, Washington, United States
 Vancouver School District, a school district in Vancouver, British Columbia, Canada
 Vicksburg-Warren School District, a school district based in Vicksburg, Mississippi, United States